Nepalese-British relations are the foreign relations between the Federal Democratic Republic of Nepal and the United Kingdom of Great Britain and Northern Ireland. Relations between the UK and Nepal have historically been friendly and there have been close links between the Royal Families. The UK is highly regarded in Nepal as a result of historical ties, development assistance and long-term support in the struggle for democratic peace in Nepal.

History
Nepal and the United Kingdom signed a treaty in 1923, the first to define the international status of Nepal as an independent and a sovereign nation. It  superseded the Sugauli Treaty signed in 1816.

The Brigade of Gurkhas of the British Army has recruited soldiers from Nepal since the 19th century.

The Embassy of Nepal marked 200 years of Nepal-UK ties in 2014. The UK is Nepal's largest bilateral aid donor.

See also
 Nepalese in the United Kingdom
 Foreign aid to Nepal
 Foreign relations of Nepal
 Foreign relations of the United Kingdom

References

Further reading 
 Matteo Miele, British Diplomatic Views on Nepal and the Final Stage of the Ch’ing Empire (1910–1911), Prague Papers on the History of International Relations, Faculty of Arts Press, Charles University, Prague, 1, 2017, pp. 90–101

External links
 UK and Nepal UK Government website
 Two Hundred Years of Nepal-Britain Relations: A Way Forward Speech by the British Ambassador to Nepal, Mr Andy Sparkes CMG, 25 September 2013
 The Britain-Nepal Society
 Britain Nepal Chamber of Commerce

 
Bilateral relations of the United Kingdom
United Kingdom